The scaly stargazer (Pleuroscopus pseudodorsalis) is a stargazer of the family Uranoscopidae. It is found in the South Atlantic, southern Indian Ocean and south western Pacific Ocean; in the South Atlantic it has been recorded from the Rio Grande Rise and the Walvis Ridge to the coasts of Namibia around southern Africa to the Madagascar Ridge, south of the island of Madagascar, in the south western Indian Ocean; in Australia it occurs from Western Australia and northern New South Wales, around New Zealand, and it also occurs on ocean ridge near Norfolk Island. It is the only species in the monotypic genus Pleuroscopus.

References

Uranoscopidae
Fish described in 1827